Alexander McCree Kennedy (11 January 1893 – 20 June 1985) was an Australian rules footballer who played for the Fitzroy Football Club in the Victorian Football League (VFL).

Notes

External links 

1893 births
1985 deaths
Australian rules footballers from Victoria (Australia)
Fitzroy Football Club players